Angsana Johor Bahru Mall is a shopping mall in Tampoi, Johor Bahru, Johor, Malaysia.

History
The shopping mall was named Plaza Angsana. In 2014, it was renamed to Angsana Johor Bahru Mall.

Architecture

Transportation
The shopping mall is accessible by Muafakat Bus route P-105. or Causeway Link (1B, 5B, 51B) from Johor Bahru Sentral railway station.

See also
 List of shopping malls in Malaysia

References

External links

 

Shopping malls in Johor Bahru